The Montague Arms is a Grade II listed building at 3 Medfield Street, Roehampton, London. Previously a public house, it dates to the 17th century, although has been altered since.

The pub was closed in 2006 and converted to offices, and later became an off licence.

References

Grade II listed buildings in the London Borough of Wandsworth
Grade II listed pubs in London
Pubs in the London Borough of Wandsworth
Roehampton
17th-century establishments in England
Former pubs in London